Senator Frederick may refer to:

Lew Frederick (born 1951), Oregon State Senate
Mel Frederick (1929–2019), Minnesota State Senate

See also
Edgar Fredricks (1942–2016), Michigan State Senate